Woodlake is a city in the San Joaquin Valley in Tulare County, California, United States. The population was 7,279 at the 2010 census, up from 6,651 at the 2000 census. In 1912, the city of Woodlake was founded by Gilbert F. Stevenson.

Geography
Woodlake is located at  (36.416435, -119.099544).

Climate
According to the Köppen Climate Classification system, Woodlake has a semi-arid climate, abbreviated "BSk" on climate maps.

Demographics

The 2010 census reported that Woodlake had a population of 7,279. The racial makeup of Woodlake was 3,691 (50.7%) White, 37 (0.5%) African American, 108 (1.5%) Native American, 52 (0.7%) Asian, 9 (0.1%) Pacific Islander, 3,072 (42.2%) from other races, and 310 (4.3%) from two or more races. Hispanic or Latino of any race were 6,381 persons (87.7%).

The whole population lived in households, no one lived in non-institutionalized group quarters and no one was institutionalized.

There were 1,966 households, 1,169 (59.5%) had children under the age of 18 living in them, 1,055 (53.7%) were opposite-sex married couples living together, 403 (20.5%) had a female householder with no husband present, 175 (8.9%) had a male householder with no wife present.  There were 177 (9.0%) unmarried opposite-sex partnerships, and 9 (0.5%) same-sex married couples or partnerships. 271 households (13.8%) were one person and 127 (6.5%) had someone living alone who was 65 or older. The average household size was 3.70.  There were 1,633 families (83.1% of households); the average family size was 4.03.

The population was spread out, with 2,626 people (36.1%) under the age of 18, 857 people (11.8%) aged 18 to 24, 1,883 people (25.9%) aged 25 to 44, 1,382 people (19.0%) aged 45 to 64, and 531 people (7.3%) who were 65 or older.  The median age was 26.4 years. For every 100 females, there were 102.3 males.  For every 100 females age 18 and over, there were 98.6 males.

The homeowner vacancy rate was 2.0%; the rental vacancy rate was 4.2%.  3,708 people (50.9% of the population) lived in owner-occupied housing units and 3,571 people (49.1%) lived in rental housing units.

Economy
In 2017, the city approved two companies’ cannabis dispensary proposals in hopes of generating tax revenue for the public service budget.

Government
The community of Woodlake is serviced by its own municipal police department. The police services building is adjacent to the City Hall complex on Valencia Boulevard.

In the state legislature Woodlake is located in the 14th Senate District, represented by Democrat Melissa Hurtado, and in the 26th Assembly District, represented by Republican Devon Mathis.

Education
The schools include, Woodlake High School, Woodlake Valley Middle School, Castle Rock Elementary School, F.J. White Elementary. Woodlake high school consists of grades 9-12. Woodlake Valley Middle School consists of grades 6-8. Castle Rock Elementary School consists of grades 3-5. F.J. White Elementary consists of grades K-2. Woodlake High School provides an anonymous tip line to help ensure the safety of their students. This tip line can consist of bullying, threats, suspicious activity, etc.

Notable people

References

External links
Woodlake official website

Cities in Tulare County, California
Incorporated cities and towns in California
San Joaquin Valley
1941 establishments in California